The 2021 Georgia Southern Eagles football team represented Georgia Southern University during the 2021 NCAA Division I FBS football season. The Eagles played their home games at Paulson Stadium in Statesboro, Georgia, and competed in the East Division of the Sun Belt Conference. They were led by third-year head coach Chad Lunsford until he was dismissed mid-season following his third consecutive loss within the first four games of the season. Cornerbacks coach Kevin Whitley was tapped to serve as interim coach until a new head coach was hired by the university.  Whitley was in his third year as cornerbacks coach and previously played for Georgia Southern as a four year starter from 1988 to 1991, helping to win two national titles for the Eagles. On November 2, 2021, Clay Helton, former head coach of the USC Trojans, was hired to become the next head coach for Georgia Southern, starting in the 2022 season.

Previous season
The Eagles finished the 2020 season 8–5, 4–4 in Sun Belt play to finish in third place in the East Division and. Southern was then invited to play in the New Orleans Bowl, their fourth postseason FBS bowl game and their third consecutive appearance. They played Louisiana Tech, where they steamrolled the Bulldogs 38-3.

Preseason

Recruiting class

|}
Source:

Award watch lists
Listed in the order that they were released

Preseason

Sources:

Sun Belt coaches poll
The Sun Belt coaches poll was released on July 20, 2021. The Eagles were picked to finish fourth in the East Division.

Sun Belt Preseason All-Conference teams

Offense

2nd team
JD king – Running Back, SR
Aaron dowell – Offensive Lineman, SR

Defense

1st team
Derrick canteen – Defensive Back, RS-SO

Special teams

2nd teams
Anthony beck ii – Punter, RS-JR
Khaleb hood – Return Specialist, JR

Personnel

Schedule
The 2021 schedule consists of 6 home and 6 away games in the regular season. The Eagles will travel to Sun Belt foes Troy, South Alabama, Texas State, and Appalachian State. Southern will play host to Sun Belt foes Louisiana,  Arkansas State, Georgia State, and Coastal Carolina.

The Eagles will host two of the four non-conference opponents at Paulson Stadium, Gardner–Webb, from NCAA Division I FCS Big South Conference and BYU, a FBS Independent, and will travel to Florida Atlantic of the Conference USA and Arkansas of the Southeastern Conference.

Game summaries

Gardner–Webb

at Florida Atlantic

at Arkansas

Louisiana

Arkansas State

at Troy

at South Alabama

Georgia State

Coastal Carolina

at Texas State

BYU

at Appalachian State

References

Georgia Southern
Georgia Southern Eagles football seasons
Georgia Southern Eagles football